Hugh Stuart Menzies (18861959) was a British advertising executive. Born in London, in 1922 he set up the Stuart Advertising Agency that worked with contemporary artists of the time such as Edward Bawden, Edward McKnight Kauffer, Ben Nicholson, and Barbara Hepworth. Menzies initially worked for Fortnum & Mason running their Invalid Delicasies Food Department before becoming a copywriter and producing the Commentaries for Fortnum & Mason - a new style of direct mail booklets illustrated by W Hendy, Menzies and Edward Bawden. The Stuart Advertising Agency were commissioned to design the logo of Imperial Airways and some of the Shell on the Road publicity for Shell-Mex & BP. Menzies's business partner, Marcus Brumwell, headed the firm when Menzies retired around 1938-9. Menzies moved with his wife, Elizabeth to Tahiti and later settled in Canada. He died in December 1959 whilst on a cruise near Gibraltar.

Bibliography
Menzies, H Stuart : 'Let's Forget Business', the commentaries of Fortnum & Mason, illus by W M Hendy, A & C Black, 1930
Menzies, H Stuart  : 'Sport and Fun All the Year Round', illus by W M Hendy,Herbert Jenkins, 1926
Skipwith, P : 'Entertaining a la Carte, Edward Bawden and Fortnum and Mason', Mainstone Press, Norwich 2008

References

1886 births
1959 deaths
Businesspeople from London
British advertising executives
20th-century English businesspeople